Lukas Sebastian Griebsch (born 28 October 2003) is a German professional footballer who plays as a left back for VfB Stuttgart II.

References

External links

2003 births
Living people
German footballers
Sportspeople from Gera
Footballers from Thuringia
Association football fullbacks
1. FC Lokomotive Leipzig players
Hallescher FC players
VfB Stuttgart II players
3. Liga players
Regionalliga players